The following roads are called Northern Parkway:
Northern Parkway (Baltimore)
Northern Parkway (Maryland suburbs), unbuilt road north from Washington, D.C.
Northern State Parkway on Long Island, New York
Northern Parkway (Arizona)